Charles A. McGaw was an American politician from Maryland. He served as a member of the Maryland House of Delegates, representing Harford County, from 1924 to 1926.

Career
McGaw was a Democrat. He served as a member of the Maryland House of Delegates, representing Harford County, from 1924 to 1926.

References

Place of birth missing
Year of birth missing
Year of death missing
Democratic Party members of the Maryland House of Delegates